Guma is a village in Abkhazia, Georgia.

See also
 Sukhumi District

References

Populated places in Sukhumi District